Leonid Ivanovich Borodin (14 April 1938, in Irkutsk – 24 November 2011, in Moscow) was a Russian novelist and journalist.

Biography
Born in Irkutsk, Borodin was a Russian Orthodox Christian and a Soviet dissident. In the 1960s he belonged to the anti-Communist All-Russian Social-Christian Union for the Liberation of the People (VSHSON). He was arrested and imprisoned in the 'strict regime' Camp 17 in 1967, and went on hunger strike there with Yuli Daniel and Aleksandr Ginzburg in 1969. 

After his release in 1973, Borodin’s works were smuggled out of the Soviet Union. The publication of an English translation of The Story of a Strange Time led to his arrest in 1982 on charges of 'anti-Soviet propaganda'. He was sentenced to 10 years of hard labour in Perm-36 Maximum Security Camp (ITK-6), as well as five years' internal exile. Released after four years, in the perestroika era, Borodin was allowed to visit the West with his wife.

Borodin was the subject and first-person narrator of the 2001 film Leonid Borodin: Looking through the Years.

A winner of many literary prizes, including the 2002 Solzhenitsyn Prize, Borodin was editor-in-chief of Moskva, a popular literary magazine. In 2005 he was appointed to the first convocation of the Public Chamber of Russia.

Works in English translation
Partings, The Harvill Press, 1988.
The Year of Miracle and Grief, Quartet Books, 1988.
The Third Truth, Harpercollins, 1992.
The Story of a Strange Time, Harpercollins, 1993.

References

External links 
 2002 interview after receiving the Solzhenitsyn Prize
 Moskva Journal
 New York Times review of ''Partings
  New York Times review of The Year of Miracle and Grief

1938 births
2011 deaths
Writers from Irkutsk
Irkutsk State University alumni
Buryat State University alumni
Russian journalists
Russian male novelists
Soviet novelists
Soviet male writers
Soviet dissidents
Soviet prisoners and detainees
Members of the Civic Chamber of the Russian Federation
Inmates of Vladimir Central Prison
Solzhenitsyn Prize winners
Moskva (magazine) editors